Achim is a railway station located in Achim, Germany. The station is located on the Bremen–Hanover railway. The train services are operated by Deutsche Bahn, Erixx and NordWestBahn. The station has been part of the Bremen S-Bahn since December 2010.

Train services
The following services currently call at the station:

Regional services  Norddeich - Emden - Oldenburg - Bremen - Nienburg - Hanover
Regional services  Bremerhaven-Lehe - Bremen - Nienburg - Hanover
Local services  Bremen - Soltau - Uelzen
Bremen S-Bahn services  Bremen-Farge - Bremen-Vegesack - Bremen - Verden

References

Railway stations in Lower Saxony
Bremen S-Bahn